Sri Sumangala National College, in Nildandahinna, Nuwara Eliya District, Sri Lanka, was founded in 1864. It is a National school with a bilingual education program and belongs to Walapane Education zone.

History 
Sri Sumangala National College was founded in 1864 with Mr.A.D. Ished Siriwardana as the 1st principal. This school was started with a very small amount of students as a mix school with only one building and named as Nildandahinna Royal School. Afterwards the school was divided into two parts with a separate school for girls with Mrs.Meegasdeniya as the 1st principal.

At present this school consists of approximately 3000 students in all grades.

Sports achievements 
The Taekwondo team of Sri Sumangala National School in Nildandahinna, Walapane, won the Inter-School Taekwondo championship - 2017, making history as the only school to win four years in a row.

The Sumangala team swept the board at the national championships this year with three gold medals, six silver medals and 13 bronze medals. Sumangala also won the overall championship title in 2015 and 2014 and 2016.

Houses 
The college has three houses, named after kings of Sri Lanka.

Name history

References

Schools in Nuwara Eliya District
1864 establishments in Ceylon
Educational institutions established in 1864
National schools in Sri Lanka